The Fezouata Formation or Fezouata Shale is a geological formation in Morocco which dates to the Early Ordovician. It was deposited in a marine environment, and is known for its exceptionally preserved fossils, filling an important preservational window beyond the earlier and more common Cambrian Burgess shale-type deposits.

Biota 

Over 1,500 non-mineralized specimens, representing 50 distinct taxa that have a composition similar to earlier Burgess Shale type biotas, have been recovered from the formations in addition to a less abundant shelly fauna.  The make-up of the community varies significantly through the stratigraphic sequence, with both abundances and faunal composition changing as time progresses.  Major burrowing is not present, but there are small (1-3 mm wide) burrows in the sediment, which may indicate that there is not enough oxygen in the water or sediment.  Particularly notable is the presence of bryozoa and graptolites, forms that are absent in the Cambrian period.  Diverse echinoderms indicate a normal range of salinity, and the overall shelly assemblage is not significantly different from the normal shelly fauna expected in open Ordovician waters.  The non-mineralized cohort contains a range of forms familiar from the Burgess Shale: Demosponges, lobopods, barnacles, annelids, radiodonts (e.g. Aegirocassis), possible halkieriids, marrellomorphs, paleoscolecid worms, nektaspids, skaniids as well as the expected problematica.  Other Ordovician oddballs are also present, including mitrates, machaeridians, cheloniellids and xiphosurans in abundance.

Depositional setting 

The fossiliferous strata were deposited just above storm wave base (offshore to lower shoreface transition), at between  water depth. Organisms were likely buried in situ. Because of its placement above storm wave base, storms would have mobilized sediment that could be quickly deposited, trapping animals and leading to their preservation. Consequently, the assemblage is dominated by benthic organisms.

Preservation 
Fossils of the Fezouata Formation, which are usually squashed flat (although some do retain some degree of their original three-dimensionality) are often coated with a dusting of pyrite, and tin; this aspect of the fossil preservation is very similar to that at Chengjiang. Non-mineralized appendages are often preserved. Both of these intervals are located near the top of the lower formation, corresponding to the Araneograptus murrayi and Hunnegraptus copiosus graptolite zones respectively.

Location and stratigraphy 
Stratigraphically productive layers are found through a -thick column of rock that spans the Tremadocian and Floian epochs.

History 
The Lagerstätten were first identified in the late 1990s when a local fossil collector, Ben Moula, showed some of the finds to a PhD student who was then working in the area.

IUGS geological heritage site
In respect of the 'exceptional fossil preservation bridging the Cambrian Explosion and the Great Ordovician Biodiversification', the International Union of Geological Sciences (IUGS) included the 'Ordovician Fezouata Shale Fossil Site at Jbeltizagzaouine' in its assemblage of 100 'geological heritage sites' around the world in a listing published in October 2022. The organisation defines an IUGS Geological Heritage Site as 'a key place with geological elements and/or processes of international scientific relevance, used as a reference, and/or with a substantial contribution to the development of geological sciences through history.'

Paleobiota 
After and subsequent literature:

Arthropods

Echinoderms

Molluscs

Conodonts

Other animals

References 

 
Geologic formations of Morocco
Ordovician System of Africa
Lower Ordovician Series
Tremadocian
Floian
Shale formations
Paleontology in Morocco
First 100 IUGS Geological Heritage Sites